Casey Jean Stoney  (born 13 May 1982) is an English professional football manager and former player who is the head coach of San Diego Wave FC. A versatile defender, she was capped more than 100 times for the England women's national football team since making her debut in 2000. After being a non-playing squad member at UEFA Women's Euro 2005, she was an integral part of the England teams which reached the UEFA Women's Euro 2009 final and the quarter finals of the FIFA Women's World Cup in 2007 and 2011. In 2012, Stoney succeeded Faye White as the England captain and also became captain of the newly formed Team GB squad for the 2012 London Olympics. She ended her playing career at Liverpool Ladies. She was appointed as the first head coach of the newly-formed Manchester United Women on 8 June 2018.

Club career

Chelsea and Arsenal
Stoney joined Chelsea Ladies, aged 12, before moving to Arsenal Ladies in 1999.

Charlton Athletic
Already an England international, Stoney joined Charlton Athletic Ladies in the summer of 2002 in search of regular first-team football. She also took up a scholarship at The Football Association's National Player Development Centre at Loughborough University. In a successful first season Stoney captained Charlton to their first FA Women's Cup final.

She led Charlton to success in the FA Women's Premier League Cup in 2004, the FA Women's Cup in 2005 as Charlton beat Everton 1–0, and the 2–1 victory over Arsenal in the 2006 Premier League Cup. When Charlton disbanded their entire women's section following the relegation of Charlton Athletic men's team in 2007, Stoney said:

Return to Chelsea
In July 2007, she signed for Chelsea Ladies along with Charlton and England teammate Eniola Aluko. In February 2009, she became player-manager until the end of the season, following the resignation of Steve Jones. At Stoney's recommendation, Matt Beard took over as manager for 2009–10.

Lincoln
On 13 March 2010 Stoney announced on Twitter that she had signed for FA WSL rivals Lincoln Ladies to play alongside England stars such as Sue Smith and Jess Clarke. Stoney stated that Lincoln offered the prospect of full-time training, which Chelsea were unable to match. Keith Boanas, her manager at Charlton, revealed that Stoney is a Chelsea supporter so found the decision extremely difficult.

Return to Arsenal
 
Stoney re-joined Arsenal on a two-year deal for the 2014 season, citing her desire to win more trophies.

Liverpool
On 13 December 2016, Liverpool confirmed that Stoney had signed with the club. She played her last match at the club on 21 February 2018. She subsequently retired to take a role in Phil Neville's backroom team in the England women's national team.

International career

England
Stoney came through England's under-age squads, making her debut for the senior team in August 2000 as a substitute against France. She was named in the provisional 30-player squad for Euro 2001 but did not make the final list of 20 and remained on the standby list. She made her first start in March 2002 against Norway, and, after spells in central defence and at right back, went on to become England's first choice left back. In February 2003 Stoney wore the captain's armband when regular skipper Karen Walker was substituted in a 1–0 friendly defeat by Italy. Her first senior international goal came as England beat Portugal 4–0 in the Algarve Cup in March 2005.

Stoney was named in the squad for Euro 2005, hosted in England, but remained unused as the hosts made a group stage exit. Her disappointment was such that she considered retiring from international football. But by the 2007 FIFA Women's World Cup in China, Stoney, preferred to Rachel Unitt at left back, was one of four England players to play every minute of every match as they lost a quarter final 3–0 to the United States. Stoney won the Nationwide International Player of the Year award for the 2007–08 season, ahead of Anita Asante and Alex Scott. In May 2009, Stoney was one of the first 17 female players to be given central contracts by The Football Association (FA).

At the Euro 2009 final tournament in Finland, Stoney recovered from a red card in a 2–1 opening match defeat by Italy to help England reach the final. Stoney explained that for many players this was not only the best moment of their careers, but possibly the happiest moment in their lives.

Stoney started all four of England's games at the 2011 FIFA Women's World Cup, and converted her kick in the quarter-final penalty shoot-out defeat to France. When pregnant Faye White retired from international football in 2012, Hope Powell appointed Stoney as the new England captain. "It's an absolute honour, the biggest privilege I've ever been given," was Stoney's response.

In 2013, Stoney became the first female member of the Professional Footballers' Association's management committee. She led England into their Euro 2013 campaign but the team performed poorly and finished in last place, to her "bitter disappointment". When England's longstanding manager Hope Powell was sacked, Stoney was left out of new boss Mark Sampson's first squad due to a foot injury. Sampson informed Stoney that her captaincy was under review, a decision she understood. Steph Houghton was then named as her successor as captain.

After being called for her third straight World Cup, Stoney said the 2015 FIFA Women's World Cup in Canada would be her last. Mostly coming out of the bench, Stoney was part of the first English team to qualify for the semi-finals. She was part of the England squad which reached the semi-finals of UEFA Women's Euro 2017 and played her last international match in a friendly against France on 21 October 2017.

Great Britain
In June 2012, Stoney was named in the 18-player Great Britain squad formed for the 2012 London Olympics. The group was selected by England manager Hope Powell and comprised 16 English players plus Scots Kim Little and Ifeoma Dieke. Stoney was confirmed in her role as captain. Stoney scored in the team's second group stage match, a 3–0 win over Cameroon. After winning all three matches and finishing at the top of the table for Group E, Great Britain advanced to the quarter finals where they faced Canada in front of 28,828 spectators at City of Coventry Stadium. Stoney was disappointed when Great Britain lost 2–0 and were knocked out. She argued for the continued participation of Great Britain at future Olympic football tournaments. England's third-place finish at the 2015 FIFA Women's World Cup secured Great Britain's qualification for the 2016 Rio Olympics, but the team were blocked from competing due to political infighting among the "Home Nations". A 2016 UEFA Women's Olympic Qualifying Tournament was convened instead.

Managerial career

Chelsea
In February 2009, she became Chelsea Ladies' player-manager until June 2009 following the resignation of Steve Jones.

England
Following her retirement in 2018, Stoney joined Phil Neville's backroom team in the England women's national team.

Manchester United
On 8 June 2018, Stoney was appointed as the first head coach of the newly-formed Manchester United Women. Stoney's first game in charge of United was a North West derby victory in the League Cup. In the inaugural season, United won the FA Women's Championship title and promotion to the FA WSL; winning 18 of 20 games and losing only once. In addition to the division title, Stoney guided United to an FA Cup quarter-final and League Cup semi-final, beating four WSL teams in the process.

On the opening weekend of the 2019–20 FA WSL season, Stoney managed United in the team's first Manchester derby in front of a crowd of 31,213, an English domestic women's league record. Manchester United lost 1–0, but prevailed six weeks later in the League Cup to earn her and the club's first Manchester derby win, beating Manchester City 2–0. On 8 November 2019, Stoney signed a contract extension with Manchester United, keeping her at the club until 2022. During the season, Stoney was a vocal critic of the quality of refereeing within the WSL, calling it "substandard" following United's 1–0 loss to Chelsea on 17 November 2019. Stoney's United, again, drew considerable media attention in February 2020 following a controversial phantom handball penalty decision against Katie Zelem in United's 1–1 draw with Reading. On 12 May 2021, it was announced Stoney would be stepping down as Manchester United manager at the end of the season having secured a second successive fourth-place league finish, one point behind Arsenal in the final Champions League qualification spot.

San Diego
On 14 July 2021, Stoney was announced as the head coach of San Diego Wave FC, which began play in 2022. Wave FC completed its first competition under Stoney, the 2022 NWSL Challenge Cup, with a third-place group stage finish in the West Division on a  record.

Personal life
In November 2012, Stoney was named 50th on The Independent newspaper's Pink List of influential lesbian and gay people in the United Kingdom. On 10 February 2014, Stoney first publicly acknowledged that she was a lesbian. She is in a relationship with her former Lincoln team mate Megan Harris. On 16 July 2014, she announced that Harris was pregnant with twins, who were born on 8 November 2014. Stoney's third child was born on 12 December 2017.

In May 2015, the University of Essex awarded Stoney an honorary degree.

Stoney was appointed Member of the Order of the British Empire (MBE) in the 2015 Birthday Honours for services to football.

Career statistics
Scores and results list England's and Great Britain's goal tally first, score column indicates score after each Stoney goal.

Managerial statistics

Honours

Player

Arsenal
FA Women's Premier League National Division: 2000–01, 2001–02
Women's FA Cup: 2001, 2014, 2016
FA Women's League Cup: 2015
FA Women's Premier League Cup: 1999–2000, 2000–01
Women's FA Community Shield: 2000, 2001

Charlton Athletic
Women's FA Cup: 2004–05
FA Women's Premier League Cup: 2003–04, 2005–06

Women's FA Community Shield: 2004

England
UEFA Women's Championship runner-up: 2009
FIFA Women's World Cup third place: 2015

Individual

FA International Player of the Year Award: 2008, 2012
FA WSL Team of the Year: 2014–15, 2015–16

Manager
Manchester United
FA Women's Championship: 2018–19

Individual
LMA Women's Championship Manager of the Month: November 2018, February 2019, April 2019
Women's Super League Manager of the Month: November 2020, December 2020
National Women's Soccer League (NWSL) Coach of the Year: 2022

References

External links

Casey Stoney profile  at the Football Association's website

1982 births
Living people
English women's footballers
England women's international footballers
Charlton Athletic W.F.C. players
Arsenal W.F.C. players
Notts County L.F.C. players
Chelsea F.C. Women players
Liverpool F.C. Women players
Women's Super League managers
Manchester United W.F.C. managers
FA Women's National League players
Alumni of Loughborough University
Women's Super League players
2007 FIFA Women's World Cup players
2011 FIFA Women's World Cup players
2015 FIFA Women's World Cup players
FIFA Century Club
Footballers at the 2012 Summer Olympics
Olympic footballers of Great Britain
Lesbian sportswomen
British LGBT footballers
English LGBT sportspeople
Sportspeople from Basildon
Women's association football defenders
Members of the Order of the British Empire
English women's football managers
National Women's Soccer League coaches
English expatriate football managers
21st-century English LGBT people
San Diego Wave FC coaches
People associated with the University of Essex
UEFA Women's Euro 2017 players